Bradley Fanelon Jennings (born December 2, 1977) is a former American football linebacker. He played college football at Florida State.

A native of Miami, Jennings attended Carol City High School, where he was a first-team Class 6A linebacker as a senior. Jennings led the Chiefs in tackles and had a dominating performance in the 1996 state championship win over Tampa Hillsborough. He was rated as the No. 3 linebacker in Florida by the Florida Times-Union, and selected FSU over Auburn and West Virginia.

An All-Conference linebacker leading the Seminoles in tackles as a senior, Jennings was regarded as an NFL Draft prospect, until just three weeks before the 2002 NFL Draft, on March 30, 2002, he was near-fatally shot twice in the right shoulder by a jittery carjacker. He eventually went undrafted and never played in the NFL.

Jennings settled in Jacksonville, Florida, and became an assistant football coach at Mandarin High School. In November 2009, he was charged with aggravated assault after a failed attempt to rob a Check 'n Go store in the Southside neighborhood of Jacksonville. Jennings claimed it was pre-Halloween prank.
Jennings now holds the linebacker coaching spot at Sandalwood High School where his son Branden attends.

References

External links 
Florida State Seminoles bio

1977 births
Living people
American football linebackers
Florida State Seminoles football players
Players of American football from Miami